Caleb Grandy House is a historic home located near Belcross, Camden County, North Carolina. It was built about 1787, and is a -story, hall-and-parlor plan Late Georgian style dwelling. It has a gable roof and one-story shed-roof porch. It features massive paved, double shouldered chimneys at the gable ends. The house was restored in the 1940s by architect Frank Dawson.

It was listed on the National Register of Historic Places in 1982.

References

Houses on the National Register of Historic Places in North Carolina
Georgian architecture in North Carolina
Houses completed in 1787
Houses in Camden County, North Carolina
National Register of Historic Places in Camden County, North Carolina
1787 establishments in North Carolina